Denim Blue is the solo record debut by Chris Seefried, recorded before and during the making of his band Low Stars debut. It features musical contributions from David Immergluck of Counting Crows and Richard Lloyd of Television. The songs "Hand of Fate" and "Sweet Love" were featured as opening and end titles respectively in the Jenna Elfman film Touched, released in 2005.

Track listing 
All tracks written by Chris Seefried.

 "Denim Blue" – 3:08
 "More or Less" – 3:21
 "Sweet Love" – 3:51
 "You Make Me" – 3:47
 "Beautiful Mess" – 4:02
 "Empty" – 2:24
 "Great Big Sky" – 3:59
 "Hand of Fate" – 4:00
 "Justified/Ballad of the Unborn Child" – 6:53
 "Mint Leaf" – 2:23

Personnel 
 Chris Seefried – vocals, acoustic & electric guitar, bass, piano, hammond B3, harmonium, harmonica
 Gary DeRosa – organ, electric piano
 David Immergluck – acoustic & electric guitar, mandolin, pedal steel, bass, background vocals
 Richard Lloyd – electric guitar
 Henry Diltz – harmonica
 Tony Shanahan – bass
 Don Heffington – drums, percussion
 Rich Pagano – drums, percussion, background vocals, mixer
 Chris Stills – background vocals
 Sheldon Gomberg – double bass
 Brett Simons – bass
 Ludvig Girdland – strings
 Will Schillinger – engineer
 Robert Hawes – engineer
 Rich Lamb – engineer

Promotional videos 

 "Bowl of Cherries" (2005), directed by Ehud Lazin
 "More or Less" (2008), directed by Rebecca Chambers

2008 debut albums
Albums produced by Chris Seefried